Pudupet is a Neighbourhood located in Chennai district of Tamil Nadu in India. Pudupet is known for its sales of Automobile spare parts and old vehicles and their spares.

Location 
Pudupet is located near Egmore, in Chennai at an elevation of 32 m above the mean sea level and with the geographical coordinates of: 13°04'08.8"N, 80°15'51.1"°E (i.e. 13.0691°N, 80.2642°E).

Transport

Road transport 
Pudupet is well connected by roads. Metropolitan Transport Corporation operates a lot of buses via. Pudupet. People from other areas of Chennai and other districts visit Pudupet using the bus services operated through the nearby Anna Salai.

Rail transport 
Chennai Egmore railway station which is very nearer to Pudupet serves it better for the people who come from a long way via. Tambaram. Chennai Central railway station which is about 2 km from Pudupet also helps people coming from far away via. Tiruvallur. Other metro (railway) stations are: LIC metro station, Government Estate metro station, Chintadripet railway station, Thousand Lights metro station, and so on. Egmore metro station serves residents of localities of Pudupet, Periyamet, Vepery and more.

Air transport 
People from other states and districts that are served by airports can reach Pudupet by coming to Chennai International Airport which is 16 km from Pudupet and then by using rail or road transport facilities.

Police Quarters 
At the cost of ₹100.3 crore, residential quarters containing 596 houses for policemen attached to Armed Reserve, are constructed in Pudupet.

References 

Neighbourhoods in Chennai